Anderson Bonabart (born May 4, 1980) is a Micronesian former swimmer, who specialized in sprint freestyle events. Bonabart qualified for the men's 50 m freestyle at the 2004 Summer Olympics in Athens, by receiving a Universality place from FINA in an entry time of 28.07. He set a Micronesian record of 26.75 to lead the second heat against seven other swimmers, including 15-year-old Malique Williams of Antigua and Barbuda. Bonabart failed to advance into the semifinals, as he placed sixty-eighth overall out of 86 swimmers in the prelims.

References

External links
 

1980 births
Living people
Federated States of Micronesia male freestyle swimmers
Olympic swimmers of the Federated States of Micronesia
Swimmers at the 2004 Summer Olympics